"Candida" is a 1962 Australian television play.

It was an adaptation of the play Candida by George Bernard Shaw and was directed by visiting producer Peter Cotes. It was one of several productions Cotes did in Australia.  It was originally made for HSV-7 then presented as part of the General Motors Hour .
 Australian TV drama was relatively rare at the time.

Plot
Candida is married to Rev James Morrell.

Cast
Joan Miller as Candida
Lewis Flander as Marchbanks
William Hodge as Burgess
Jeffrey Hodgson as Rev Alexander Mill
Madeline Howell as Proserpine Garnett
Geoffrey King as Morell

Production
Joan Miller had performed the title role on the West End in 1953. The production was shot in Melbourne.

It was one of four productions Cotes made in Australia, the others being Long Distance, Suspect, and Shadow of the Vine. He said he would have made more but for the credit freeze. Cotes made it a year before it aired.

Reception
The TV critic for the Sydney Morning Herald said the production "had all the virtues of brilliant casting and all the vices of poor technique... [it] appeared simply as a televised stage production, without any special reference to the distinctive vocabulary of TV, production itself. In addition, camera work, sound and sets were well below par for the course; camera angles were monotonous and too inclusive_, sound poor, and sets fussily elaborate and consequently distracting. Few will cavil at the quality of the acting, however."

The Bulletin also gave it a poor review saying it "had   a   fine   period setting,   Miss   Joan   Miller   in   the   title   role, and   dialogue   to   match   the   furnishings."

The Age called it "another example of a brilliant professional at work" although felt Miller "did not however have the impact of her earlier roles."

References

External links
 

1960s Australian television plays
1962 television plays
1962 Australian television episodes
The General Motors Hour